The list of Akan people includes notable individuals of Akan meta-ethnicity and ancestry; the Akan people who are also referred to as  are a meta-ethnicity and Potou–Tano Kwa ethno-linguistic group that are indigenously located on the Ashantiland peninsula near the equator precisely at the "centre of the Earth".

Academic figures and inventors

Architects and designers

Businesspersons and entrepreneurs

Economists and bankers

Folklore

Judges and lawyers

Media

Actors and actresses

Authors and novelists

Filmmakers

Journalists

Musicians

Television presenters

Monarchs

Physicians

Models

Sports

American footballers

Canadian footballers

Rugby League players

Basketball players

Boxers

Combat sports

Footballers

Football managers

Skiers

Warriors and revolutionary leaders

Military personnel

Citations

External links

An insight guide to Akanland’s culture and language
Wo Aka Dictionaries, translation into Akan
"Akan Philosophy of the Person", Stanford Encyclopedia of Philosophy (2006) ISSN 1095-5054

 
Lists of people by ethnicity